Grmovlje is a village in the Municipality of Škocjan in southeastern Slovenia. The area is part of the historical region of Lower Carniola. The municipality is now included in the Southeast Slovenia Statistical Region. Within the municipality, the village is the administrative centre of the Village Community of Grmovlje.

The local church is dedicated to Saint George and belongs to the Parish of Škocjan. It was built in 1761.

References

External links
Grmovlje at Geopedia

Populated places in the Municipality of Škocjan